7α-Hydroxycholesterol is a precursor of bile acids, created by cholesterol 7α-hydroxylase (CYP7A1). Its formation is the rate-determining step in bile acid synthesis.

References

Sterols